"Doing Too Much" is the debut single released by American singer Paula DeAnda. It features Baby Bash. It reached number forty-one on the US Billboard Hot 100. The single peaked at n°9 on the Billboard rhythmic & n°9 on the US Top 10 Hot R&B Songs (Billboard. A Spanish version of the song was also released entitled "Lo Que Hago Por Tu Amor". (Translated: "What I Do for Love").

Charts

Weekly charts

Year-end charts

Certifications and sales

References

2006 songs
2006 debut singles
Paula DeAnda songs
Baby Bash songs
Songs written by Happy Perez
Music videos directed by Diane Martel
Arista Records singles
Songs written by Baby Bash